Christine Brady is an American philanthropist best known for her work with The Americas Foundation Fundación de las Américas building schools in Tijuana.  She is the founder of the La Esperanza schools of Tijuana, Baja California, Mexico.

References

American philanthropists
Living people
Year of birth missing (living people)